Dorian Malovic is a French journalist, winner of the 2007 Grand prix catholique de littérature.

Life 
Malovic has been head of the "Asia" department of the daily La Croix in Paris since 1997 and French writer, specializing on China. He was a press correspondent in Hong Kong for various media. He has contributed to various books, programmes and conferences on the theme of Asia.

Works 
 Hong Kong, un destin chinois, Bayard Presse, 1997.
 Mgr Zen, un homme en colère, interviews with the Cardinal of Hong Kong Joseph Zen, Bayard, 2007.
 Évadés de Corée du Nord, témoignages with Juliette Morillot, Presses de la Cité, Éditions Belfond, Paris, 2004.
 Le Pape jaune : Mgr Jin Luxian, soldat de Dieu en Chine communiste, written with the advice of the sinologist Simon Leys, Éditions Perrin, 2006.
 La Chine sur le divan, Plon, 2008.
 China Love, 2016.
 La Corée du Nord en 100 questions with Juliette Morillot, Tallandier, 2016.

Prizes 
 Grand prix catholique de littérature, 2007, for Le Pape jaune
 Prix du meilleur livre géopolitique 2018.

References

External links 
 Dorian Malovic on France Inter

Year of birth missing (living people)
Living people
Place of birth missing (living people)
French male journalists
21st-century French journalists
21st-century French writers